Empress Erzhu may refer to the following Xianbei empresses of the Northern Wei dynasty:

 Empress Erzhu (Yuan Ziyou's wife) (died 556), wife of Yuan Ziyou (Emperor Xiaozhuang), daughter of Erzhu Rong
 Empress Erzhu (Yuan Ye's wife) ( 530–533), wife of Yuan Ye, daughter of Erzhu Zhao
 Empress Erzhu (Yuan Gong's wife) ( 532), wife of Yuan Gong (Emperor Jiemin), daughter of Erzhu Zhao

Erzhu